Irish Multiplex Cinemas (or the IMC Cinema Group) is a cinema chain in Ireland. It operates cinemas throughout Ireland and Northern Ireland. It was part of the Ward Anderson company until 2013, when it was split between IMC and Omniplex Cinema Group.

The typical cinema owned by IMC has between five and ten screens. The company owns 18 Cinemas altogether, with 15 in the Republic of Ireland and 3 in Northern Ireland, most recently buying Movieland in Newtownards, County Down after the passing of its owner.

The company's flagship is the Savoy Cinema in O'Connell Street, Dublin, which is the oldest operational cinema in Dublin, and the preferred cinema in Ireland for film premières. It also owned the Screen Cinema in D'Olier Street, which showed more alternative films but closed down in 2015.

Each cinema has different offers with some being on specific days, looking at their website gives all details on offers. Offers include cinema ticket price reductions and concession deals.

Cinema locations

References

External links
IMC Cinemas

Cinema chains in the Republic of Ireland